The Airdrome Nieuport 17 is an American amateur-built aircraft, designed and produced by Airdrome Aeroplanes, of Holden, Missouri. The aircraft is supplied as a kit for amateur construction.

The aircraft is a full-scale replica of the First World War French Nieuport 17 fighter. The replica is built from modern materials and powered by modern engines.

Design and development
The Airdrome Nieuport 17 features a "V"-strut sesquiplane layout, a single-seat open cockpit, fixed conventional landing gear and a single engine in tractor configuration.

The aircraft is made from bolted-together aluminum tubing, with its flying surfaces covered in doped aircraft fabric. The kit is made up of twelve sub-kits. The standard engine used is the  four stroke Volkswagen air-cooled engine. Building time from the factory-supplied kit is estimated at 400 hours by the manufacturer. The aircraft can be constructed as a Nieuport 17 or as the more refined  Nieuport 17bis.

Operational history
Nine examples had been completed by December 2011.

Specifications (Nieuport 17)

See also
Circa Reproductions Nieuport

References

Homebuilt aircraft
Single-engined tractor aircraft
Sesquiplanes